The Alpine Academy – formerly known as the RF1 Driver Programme, Renault Driver Development and Renault Sport Academy – is a program to support young racing drivers through their careers. The programme was created by Renault F1 in 2002.

In 2011, the programme was renamed LRGP Academy, following the rebranding of the team to "Lotus Renault GP". In 2012, the programme was renamed Lotus F1 Team iRace Professional Programme and 2013–2015, the programme was renamed Lotus F1 Junior Team. In 2021, the programme was renamed Alpine Academy after the rebranding of the Renault F1 team into Alpine F1 Team. In March 2022, the Alpine Affiliates programme was launched as a support to drivers starting their motorsport careers, and is intended to be a feeder for the Alpine Academy.

Current drivers

Former drivers

Renault / Lotus Renault GP (2002–2011, 2016–present) 

 Championship titles highlighted in bold.

Lotus F1 (2012–2015)

See also 
 Alpine F1 Team

Notes

References

External links
Renault Formula One Official website - Renault Sport Academy

Renault in motorsport
Racing schools